Ryan Johnson (born 1978) is a visual artist based in Brooklyn, New York. His sculptures are "made from a variety of materials, among them wood, medical casting tape and sheet metal," and they have been described as having "strange spatial compressions, surreal displacements and quasi-Futurist illusions of movement."

Johnson grew up in Jakarta, Indonesia, and graduated from Jakarta International School.
He holds a BFA from Pratt Institute and an MFA from Columbia University. His work has been featured in exhibitions at MoMA PS1 in New York, Casino Luxembourg - Forum d'Art Contemporain, The Contemporary Museum, Honolulu (now the Honolulu Museum of Art Spalding House), and the Saatchi Gallery in London (among others).

Solo exhibitions
2017 Life Study, Nicelle Beauchene Gallery, New York, NY

2012 Self Storage, Suzanne Geiss Company, New York, NY

2010 Description of a Struggle, Sikkema Jenkins and Co., New York, NY

2008 Watchman, Guild & Greyshkul, New York, NY

2007 Ambien Eyes, Franco Soffiantino Arte Contemporanea, Turin, Italy

2005 Modern Human Animal, LFL Gallery, New York, NY

Selected group exhibitions
2018 Visitors from Shallow Space, Fresh Window, Brooklyn, NY

2017 Cupid Angling, John H. Baker Gallery, West Chester University, West Chester, PA

2016 Fort Greene, curated by Adrianne Rubenstein, Venus LA, Los Angeles, CA
Life Study, EDDYSROOM, Greenpoint, NY
 
2015 Under Foundations, curated by Jess Wilcox, Sculpture Center, Long Island City, NY
Eagles II, Galeria Marlborough, Madrid, Spain
 
2014 Forever, Metropolitan Art Society, Beirut, Lebanon
Imaginary Portraits, curated by Dodie Kazanjian, Gallery Met, New York, NY
Pale Fire, Leroy Neiman Gallery, Columbia University, New York, NY 

2013 High, Low, and In Between, with Ryan Johnson, Johannes VanDerBeek, and Sara VanDerBeek, White Flag Projects, St. Louis, MO

2012 Pewter Wings, Golden Horns, Stone Veils, GRIMM Gallery, The Netherlands

2010 NeoIntegrity: Comics Edition, Museum of Comics and Cartoon Art, New York, NY

2009 Abstract America: New Painting and Sculpture, Saatchi Gallery, London, UK
On From Here, Guild & Greyshkul, New York, NY

2008 Without Walls, Museum 52, New York, NY 
Imaginary Thing, curated by Peter Eleey, Aspen Art Museum, Aspen, CO

2007 BRAIN FORM, Guild & Greyshkul, New York, NY
Capricci (possibilities of other worlds), Casino Luxembourg – Forum d'Art Contemporain, Luxembourg 
MASH, The Helena, New York, NY

2006 2006 Untitled (For H.C. Westermann), curated by Michael Rooks, The Contemporary Museum, Honolulu, HI 
Metaphysics of Youth, curated by Luigi Fassi and Irina Zucca Alessandrelli, Artenova-Fuoriuso, Pescara, Italy
Turn the Beat Around, Sikkema Jenkins and Co., New York, NY
Ionesco's Friends, curated by Irina Zucca Alessandrelli, Franco Soffiantino Arte Contemporanea, Turin, Italy

2005 Greater New York P.S.1, Queens, NY 
Who is the Protagonist? curated by Ohad Meromi, Guild & Greyshkul, New York, NY

2004 Pattern Playback, curated by Silvia Cubina, The Moore Space, Miami, FL
Four-Ply, Andrea Rosen Gallery, New York, NY
Hung, Drawn, and Quartered, curated by Miriam Katzeff, Team Gallery, New York, NY

2003 Pantone, curated by David Hunt, Massimo Audiello, New York, NY
Burnt Orange, Heresy Space 101, Brooklyn, NY

References

Further reading
Interview with the Ryan Johnson 2012 lodownmagazine.com

External links
Official Website: ryanjohnsonstudio.com
Ryan Johnson on ArtFacts.net
Further information from the Saatchi Gallery
Ryan Johnson on ArtNet.com
Ryan Johnson at Frieze: FriezeArtFair.com

1978 births
Living people
American artists
Pratt Institute alumni
Columbia University School of the Arts alumni